The following articles contain lists of countries by debt:

 List of countries by public debt
 List of countries by household debt
 List of countries by corporate debt
 List of countries by external debt